Serhiy Mykolayovych Lohinov (born 24 August 1990) is a Ukrainian professional footballer who plays as a centre-back for  in the Ukrainian Premier League. He has previously played for Oleksandriya.

Career
In January 2023 he moved to Oleksandriya.

Personal life
His brother Oleksandr Lohinov is also a professional footballer.

Honours
Ukraine U19
UEFA European Under-19 Championship: 2009

References

External links
 
 
 

1990 births
Living people
Footballers from Dnipro
Ukrainian footballers
Ukraine youth international footballers
Association football defenders
FC Dnipro-75 Dnipropetrovsk players
FC Dynamo Kyiv players
FC Dynamo-2 Kyiv players
FC Prykarpattia Ivano-Frankivsk (2004) players
FK Sūduva Marijampolė players
FC Kremin Kremenchuk players
FC Vorskla Poltava players
FC Volyn Lutsk players
SC Dnipro-1 players
Ukrainian Premier League players
Ukrainian First League players
Ukrainian Second League players
Ukrainian Amateur Football Championship players
A Lyga players
Ukrainian expatriate footballers
Expatriate footballers in Lithuania
Ukrainian expatriate sportspeople in Lithuania